State University of New York Brockport (also known as SUNY Brockport or Brockport State, and previously The College at Brockport) is a public university in Brockport, New York. It is part of the State University of New York (SUNY).

History

Clubs and organizations

Brockport Greek life
Brockport has a small Greek life, with both fraternities and sororities. Each organization does many events each semester and raises money for many different causes. Currently at Brockport there is one NIC (National Interfraternity Conference) Fraternity- Pi Kappa Phi (ΠΚΦ), two NPC (National Panhellenic Conference) sororities- Phi Sigma Sigma and Delta Phi Epsilon, and two multicultural Greek organizations- Alpha Phi Alpha and Delta Sigma Theta. Brockport also has a Service Fraternity Alpha Phi Omega, a co-ed organization.

In 1869, with the help of Professor Charles Donald McLean, the Principal of the school, Gamma Sigma was founded at The Brockport Normal School. Gamma Sigma was the first fraternity formed in the United States, at the high school level. On October 11 of that year, eighteen young men met in the chemistry room to form a society for the purpose of improving themselves in debate, original composition and other literary exercises. The charter members were: Edward L. Adams, John D. Burns, Charles Cunningham, William K. Dean, Martin L. Deyo, John Norris Drake, A. James Knox, S. E. Loomis, John M. Milne, A. Judson Osborn, Frederick Palmer, George T. Quinby, George Hebert Raymond, William H. Sybrandt, James W. White, Stephen D. Wilbur, Ara Wilkinson, and George F. Yeoman. Mr. Yeoman was elected the first President. James Knox was chairman of the constitution committee.

Off note, Mr. Yeoman in later years took the oath of office as a justice of the Supreme Court for the Seventh Judicial District of the State on November 15, 1893. There is a note printed in the book "Notable Men of Rochester" published in 1902 by Dwight J. Stoddard regarding Mr. Yeoman, who was so well respected.

Talon Television and Production (previously Brockport Television)
Funded by BSG, Talon Television is the official TV station club at The College at Brockport. This student-run organization produces videos and covers various school programs and events. Departments include News, Sports, Entertainment, and Promotions.

Brockport Student Government (BSG)
The Brockport Student Government (BSG), funded by mandatory student fees, provides extensive programming on campus. BSG consists of the three traditional branches of government: legislative, judicial, and executive. BSG's budget totals approximately $1,400,000 annually. Programming events include the Spring Break Challenge, where 5 people win $5,000 to go wherever they want for spring break. Other events are major concerts (e.g. Big Sean, Gym Class Heroes, Machine Gun Kelly, and Kesha) and lectures (e.g. Abby Wambach). These events are planned out by the Brockport Student Government and the Union Programming Team.

Harlequins Performing Arts Club 
The Harlequins Performing Arts Club (Harlequins) is a student organization that looks to create a professional theatre experience for the benefit of its members and the college community as a whole. Each semester, the club hosts a wide range of student performances, workshops, and social events. Through these, the club aims to provide a creative outlet for students, as well as a forum to hone skills learned in the classroom.

The Stylus
The Stylus is the student weekly newspaper of The College at Brockport. It is funded by the BSG Mandatory Fee and has a circulation of 5,000.

WBSU 89.1 The Point
89.1 The Point is the student-run radio station located in the Seymour College Union, funded by the Brockport Student Government. The Point broadcasts to as many as 500,000 people throughout the Western New York region, and reaches from west Rochester to Buffalo. The Point has several communications majors as members, but also invites non-communication majors to join the station. The Point has several departments: FM, Sports, News, Production, Circuit, Public Relations, Website, Engineering, and Sales. The Point is involved in the community and helps with the Hilton Apple Fest in the fall, Coats for Kids in the winter, and more events in the local community. The Point's objective is to provide a "working classroom" for students, and to build the community. The station is open to the public Monday through Friday from 9:00 AM to 5:00 PM.

Athletics

Brockport fields 23 athletic teams competing at the NCAA Division III level.

Buildings on campus
A. Huntley Parker Jr. Field

Home of Brockport’s men’s and women's soccer teams.

Allen Administration Building

The Allen Administration Building was built in 1973 and named after Gordon F. Allen, who was an education professor, dean and then acting president from 1964 to 1965. It is used for both administrative and academic purposes. It is home to the Office of the President, central administration, as well as some instructional classrooms.

Albert W. Brown Building (Formerly the Faculty Office Building)

Albert W. Brown (1965–1981) presided over The College at Brockport during a period of rapid change and expansion, as the college grew from 3,000 students to a record of 11,000 students. The Faculty Office Building was one of the major construction projects completed during Brown's tenure. Campus growth at that time included the addition of a new library, office, academic, athletic, and high-rise residence hall buildings.

The Albert W. Brown Building is connected by a pedestrian bridge to the Drake Memorial Library and the Allen Administration building. It houses offices for the deans and associate deans of the School of Letters and Sciences, School of Professions, and School of Arts and Performance, as well as faculty offices for 15 academic departments. The Albert W. Brown Building is home to an extensive art collection of paintings, sculptures and photographs on display throughout the building within its .

Alumni House

This Victorian-era home was built in the 1860s and bought by the state in 1898 for use as a residence by the principal. Before the house was bought, the principals had lived in an apartment in the school building. David Smith was the first principal to live in the house, and the last was Donald Tower, who retired in 1964. In a collection of reminiscences of the house published in the AlumNews in 1985, the following memories were shared. Mrs. Clyde Walters, class of 1918, recalled her friendship with Principal Thompson's daughter Miriam and attending Miriam's wedding, which was held in the house. Mrs. Fletcher Garlock,the granddaughter of Thompson, mentioned that she was born in the house and remembered roller-skating in the kitchen! Both Wilbur McCormick '37 and Bruce Schlageter '47 recalled as undergraduates visiting with Dr. Hartwell in the house to chat about school affairs. After 1964 the building was used for office space and other purposes until, in 1976, the Alumni Association acquired the building. The house has been restored and is the site of many alumni and community functions.

Benedict Hall

Benedict Hall was built in 1965 and named after Edgar Benedict (1905–1990) who was a longtime member of the Board of Trustees (1945–1962). Benedict Hall, along with Gordon, Dobson, and Harmon Halls, is a dormitory complex that was designed to accommodate over 600 students. This three-story dormitory is styled in a suite manner, with two bedrooms connected by a living room and a bathroom shared by four student residents. Benedict Hall currently houses freshmen students.

Bramley Hall

Bramley Hall was built in 1968 and named after Herbert Bramley (1867–1945), a longtime member of the Board of Trustees from 1935 to 1945 and a prominent local business person. Bramley Hall considered one of the high-rise dormitories along with Briggs, Perry, and Mortimer Halls, is home to upper-class students. This dorm was designed to have four suites of six students on each floor. The six students share three bedrooms, a living area, and a bathroom.

Briggs Hall

Briggs Hall was built in 1968 and named after Elizabeth Briggs (1885–1965), who was a Campus School history teacher at Brockport from 1910 to 1943. Briggs Hall is part of the high-rise dormitory complex along with Bramley, Perry, and Mortimer Halls, located at the west end of campus. This upper-class student dorm was designed to have four suites of six students on each floor. The six students share three bedrooms, a living area, and a bathroom.

Brockport Field

Home of Brockport's field hockey and women's lacrosse teams.

Brockport Tennis Courts

Home of Brockport's tennis team.

Brockway Hall

Brockway Hall was built in 1966 and named after Hiel Brockway, a co-founder of Brockport, New York, who in 1836 donated the land on which Hartwell Hall now stands.

Today, the Brockway building serves as a dining hall for students who live in traditional style dormitories. Brockway Hall also houses the BASC offices and is where new students can receive their photo identification.

Burlingame House

Chapman Service Center

Clark V. Whited Complex

Home of Brockport's baseball and softball teams.

Commissary

Conrad Welcome Center

Cooper Hall

Cooper Hall was built in 1965 and named after Charles Cooper, the head of the "training" school at Brockport from 1911 to 1936.

Cooper's background included Millersville State Normal in Pennsylvania and a bachelor's degree from Bucknell University, eventually supplemented by a master's from the Teacher's College at Columbia University. Cooper was intensely interested in the Training School and the athletic program of the Normal School.

Cooper Hall was the home to the Campus School and was designed with elementary students in mind. However, the Campus School closed in 1981, and today the building serves many functions. The elementary classrooms are still filled with young children, as one wing of the building is home to the Brockport Child Development Center, a NAEYC-accredited daycare and preschool. Other classrooms and offices are utilized by the Anthropology Education and Military Science departments, and other wings belong to the Delta College, Honors Program, and McNair Program.

Dailey Hall

Dailey Hall was built in 1967 and named after Vincent Dailey, a Brockport native and the Chairman of the New York State Democratic Party who played a decisive role in obtaining funds for the construction of Hartwell Hall.

Dailey Hall was constructed as one of three dining halls during the building boom of the late 1960s. In 1992, it became the new home of Academic Computing Services and is the main computer lab on campus today. Its centralized location on campus made the building the logical choice for the primary computer facility and smaller computer labs. Staff in Cooper and Drake Library were consolidated into the new Dailey Hall facility.

Dobson Hall

Dobson Hall was built in 1965 and named after Thomas Dobson (1852–1930) who served on the Board of Trustees from the 1890s until 1930. Dobson was appointed secretary for the board of trustees in 1892, as the successor to Daniel Holmes. He was a druggist by occupation, served as Mayor of the Village, and was extremely active in church affairs of St. Luke's and the Masons. Mr. Dobson supported student activities like the lecture series and performances and allowed tickets for these events to be sold in his store.

Dobson Hall, along with Gordon, Benedict, and Harmon Halls, is a dormitory complex that was designed to accommodate over 600 students. This three-story tall dormitory is styled in a suite manner, with two bedrooms connected by a living room and a bathroom shared by four student residents. Dobson Hall currently houses new freshmen students.

Drake Memorial Library

In the beginning, the library was a little collection of books housed in a room open only a few hours per week and was primarily used by faculty for reference purposes. It also included a textbook collection and the school's laboratory equipment. As teacher training education became more sophisticated, so did the library.

In the last years of the 1890s, Jeanette Reynolds, who had been a secretary at the school, became the librarian. In 1899 she cataloged the collection according to the then-new Dewey Decimal system. Affectionately remembered by alumni as "Jenny Wren," she laid the foundations of a modern library. The library she presided over was in the central part of the old Normal School building and included such things as a "pen writing room" for writing with the fountain pens of that era – only pencils were allowed in the library proper!

In Fall 1939, construction began on the building we know as Hartwell Hall, replacing the old Normal School building. The library in Hartwell was on the second floor, in the center of the building. From the 1940s on the school began to expand, beginning with the winning of teacher's college status in 1942, which called for the expansion of library collections and staff. Hours were extended, and the tradition of library instruction, which dated back to the era of "Jenny Wren," continued.

With the postwar expansion of the college, the library became terribly crowded, and staff schedules actually had to be planned around the small number of available work areas.

In 1961 the college opened the first building dedicated exclusively as a library, Drake Memorial Library. It was named after two unrelated college staff members, Bernard Drake and Ruth Drake. Bernard Drake was an administrator, Education professor, and the dean of students from 1936 to 1957. He graduated from the Normal School at Fredonia and received his master's degree from Columbia. Drake worked in public schools as Supervising Principal or Superintendent of school in New York communities including Celeran, Silver Creek, and Babylon. Prior to his arrival at Brockport, he had been working toward his doctorate at Columbia. Drake initiated a study on the existing structured curriculum of the college in 1948, which resulted in the offering of a greater selection of courses to students.

The name also pays homage to Ruth Drake, who was a member of the faculty for 31 years. Ms. Drake was born in Evanston, Illinois and graduated from Wellesley College in 1926. She entered Brockport as a Kindergarten instructor in 1928, and later earned her master's degree from Columbia in 1946, and a degree in Library Science from Western Reserve University. After several years as the campus Kindergarten Critic, Ms. Drake became the Campus School Librarian until her retirement in 1959.

This new building would serve as the home of the library until 1974, when the library moved to its current location on the south side of campus next to Allen. The old building, now named Rakov, serves as home to many of the school's enrollment and business offices.

Eagle Hall

Edwards Hall

Edwards Hall was built in 1968 and named after Aletta Edwards and William Edwards, no relation. Aletta Edwards (?-1939) was an English professor and chair of the department from 1908 to 1934. She graduated from the former State Normal School at Brockport and received her Bachelor of Philosophy degree from Syracuse University. She received her master's degree at the University of Rochester and did advanced work toward her doctorate at the University of Wisconsin, and at Cambridge University, England.

William Edwards (1902–1959) was chair of the Social Sciences Department from 1941 to 1959. He was born in Washington Court House, Ohio and attended both the University of Chicago and Ohio State University, where he received his bachelor's and master's of history in the same year. After doing graduate work at the University of Minnesota and Brookings Institution of Washington, DC, he returned to Ohio State for his PhD During his term at Brockport, Edwards did an exchange professorship with the University of Madras in India, where he taught politics.

Edwards Hall is the main lecture hall on campus and holds the Blue Room, the largest instructional room at Brockport.

Eunice Kennedy Shriver Stadium

Eunice Kennedy Shriver Stadium (formerly Special Olympics Stadium) is the largest on-campus Division III football stadium in the NCAA. It is the home of Brockport’s football, men's lacrosse, and outdoor track and field teams.

Faculty Office Building

See Albert W. Brown Building.

Gordon Hall

Gordon Hall was built in 1966 and named after Ida and Luther Gordon. The Gordon family was prominent locally and Ida Gordon (1854–1946) was one of two women appointed to the board of trustees in 1917. Luther Gordon (1822–1881) was a successful business person who supported the school at a crucial financial point just after the Civil War.

Luther Gordon was a lumber dealer in the village, and a political force in the Republican Party. Mr. Gordon, along with other town members, refused to pay the Normal School taxes, and he instituted a suit in the Supreme Court against the village for seizing lumber. The court declared the village actions legal, and the tax was paid. Yet afterwards, Mr. Gordon bought half the bonds issued to construct the new Normal building.

Gordon Hall, along with Benedict, Dobson, and Harmon Halls, is a dormitory complex that was designed to accommodate over 600 students. This three-story tall dormitory is styled in a suite manner, with two bedrooms connected by a living room, and a bathroom shared by four student residents. Gordon Hall currently offers a substance-free floor, 24-hour quiet floors, and a returning scholars' floor.

Harmon Hall

Harmon Hall was built in 1966 and named after George Harmon Jr. (1880–?), a local business person who, as leader of the "Committee on One Hundred," headed the fight of the later 1930s to get a new building for Brockport.

George Harmon Jr. was in the marble business prior to becoming a local insurance agent. He served as Mayor, Secretary of the Agricultural Society, was an honorary member of the Board of Managers, and Secretary of the NYS Association of Town Fairs.

Harmon Hall, along with Benedict, Dobson, and Gordon Halls, is a dormitory complex that was designed to accommodate over 600 students. This three-story tall dormitory is styled in a suite manner, with two bedrooms connected by a living room, and a bathroom shared by four student residents.

Harrison Hall

Harrison hall was built in 1967 and named after Henry Harrison, a member of the Board of Trustees from 1891 to 1935 and an active and influential supporter of the school.

Henry Harrison was one of the village's most distinguished citizens. He served as President of the Local Board of Managers for 44 years. From 1896 to 1898, he represented the 45th district in the State Senate and later was Collector of Customs in Rochester. Harrison also served as the chairperson of the Monroe County Draft Board during World War I, and was active in the Red Cross, University Club, and the Chamber of Commerce in Rochester.

Harrison Hall serves as a dining center for the high-rise dorms and suite dorms. This building is located on the western end of the campus and offers traditional meals on the second floor. On the first floor there is a fast food eatery called Trax, and a small convenience store called the Eagles Nest.

In October 2007, Harrison re-opened after receiving a multimillion-dollar renovation.

Hartwell Hall

Construction on Hartwell Hall was initiated in 1938, and completed in 1941. This building is named after Ernest Hartwell (1884–1965). Hartwell Hall, a lovely Georgian Colonial style brick building, stands at the historic heart of the campus. It is the oldest building on campus after the Alumni House. When finished, it made up the entire school, including classrooms, offices, swimming pool, and library.

Hazen Health Center

Hazen Health Center was built in 1967 and named after Dr. John Hazen (?-1946), a local physician who served the college for many years up until 1946. This building remains today as the Health Center, and is located in between Holmes and Dailey Halls.

Holmes Hall

Holmes Hall was built in 1967 and named for Daniel and Mary Jane Holmes. Daniel Holmes (1828–?) was on the Board of Trustees from 1854 to 1919, and wrote the Quarter Centennial in celebration of the twenty-fifth anniversary of the Brockport State Normal School. His wife Mary Jane was a very popular fiction writer who catered to her female readers by writing wholesome stories dwelling on domestic life in exotic surroundings. These backgrounds were inspired by the extensive world traveling done by Mary Jane and her husband. As Brockport's solitary literary celebrity and because of her own forceful personality, Mrs. Holmes held a very special niche in the heart of the village.

Holmes Hall is home to the Psychology and Communications departments, and was the former hub for the Brockport Stylus, the student paper. This three level building holds offices, classrooms, and labs and is an important academic building for Brockport students.

Lathrop Hall

Lathrop Hall was built in 1951 and served as the college union for eighteen years. It contained two large lounges, four meeting rooms of various sizes, two listening rooms, two guest rooms, a snack bar, a large dining room seating 250 people, a small dining room designed to seat 50, the offices for student publication, the alumni association office, and an apartment for the manager of the union. By the late sixties, the new Seymour Union facility was built to meet the growing enrollment of the student body. Lathrop has also served as the home to the Dance department, but today is the location of University Police.

Lathrop Hall was named after Henry Lathrop, a professor of mathematics at the college from 1912 to 1935. He came to Brockport as a Mathematics teacher, and eventually rose to the Head of that department, a position he occupied until his retirement in 1935. Mr. Lathrop was also advisor to the yearbook Saga staff, was active in civic affairs, and was a charter member of the Brockport Kiwanis club. Lathrop was fondly referred to as "Daddy Lathrop" by his students, and it is in his memory that Lathrop Hall stands.

Lennon Hall

Lennon Hall was built in 1964 and renovated in 2005. It has been the permanent home of the science departments (Biology, Environmental Science, Earth Science) and held many large classrooms and laboratories.

The building was named after William Lennon, a Science professor and Vice Principal of the school from 1869 to 1911. He graduated from Genesee College in Lima in 1867, and arrived in Brockport two years later as a professor of science. He succeeded to Vice Principal in 1882, and maintained that position until his retirement in 1911.

Liberal Arts Building

The Liberal Arts Building, located adjacent to Drake Memorial Library and Alumni Walk, is home to five academic departments in the School of The Arts, Humanities and Social Sciences: History, English, Modern Languages and Cultures, Philosophy and Women and Gender Studies. The space includes offices for the Dean and faculty as well as a variety of formal and informal learning environments for the Brockport campus community.

MacVicar Hall

MacVicar Hall was built in 1961 and is set up in the traditional dorm style, with a single room shared by two students. This dorm houses freshman students only.

MacVicar Hall is named after Malcolm MacVicar, the head of the school from 1863 to 1868. Malcolm MacVicar was born in Argyleshire, Scotland, in 1829. He became vice-president of the college upon his arrival in Brockport in 1858. Ordained as a Baptist minister in 1856, he found his true interest to be in education rather than preaching. He became the first president and "Professor of Moral and Intellectual Philosophy."

MacVicar became Principal of the Collegiate Institute in the spring of 1863, the last principal of the Collegiate Institute in 1866 and the first President of the successor Normal School. MacVicar lead the Brockport Collegiate Institute to victory in the fierce competition to become one of the four new state normal schools. The Normal Schools Act which established four Normal Schools was petitioned to the Legislature by Brockport under the activities of MacVicar. The Institute merged with the Normal School in 1866 because of the financial crisis that was threatening the institution's survival. The borrowing of money to upgrade the school to win state acceptance was a source of some local controversy, and he moved on to the Principalship of Potsdam Normal School and other posts of academia.

McFarlane Hall

McFarlane Hall was built in 1963 and named after Charles McFarlane, the head of the school from 1901 to 1910.

Charles T. McFarlane came to Brockport from a professorship of Geography at Ypsilanti. He was born in New Berlin, New York and received his education from the College of the City of New York and the New York Normal College in Albany. He did additional graduate work at the University of Vienna and at Harvard University, later receiving both master's and doctoral degrees in Pedagogy from the Michigan State Normal College. His ideology reflected a statewide movement to convert the liberal coursework to more strictly professional classes.

McFarlane Hall serves as a freshman dormitory and was designed in the traditional dorm style, with two students sharing a single room.

McLean Hall

McLean Hall was built in 1959 and is a traditional styled dormitory that houses freshman and international students. It was named after Charles McLean, a teacher and then principal of the school from 1865 to 1898.

Charles D. McLean was born in Ireland in 1834 of Scottish parentage. He was brought to New York in 1840 by his widowed mother and in 1856 he accepted a position as teacher at his old alma mater, and became vice principal two years later. In 1869, he became principal of the Normal School, a position he held for the next thirty years. In spite of his short stature and slight build, President McLean was an athlete and hero to most of the student athletes at the school. Professor McLean was generous in extending financial aid to students. He was both a rigid disciplinarian and a skillful teacher, especially in Mathematics and Pedagogy. Admired by his faculty and respected by his students, McLean was the dominant figure to the academic life of the school during his tenure as principal.

Morgan Hall

Morgan Hall was built in 1951 and served as a dormitory before undergoing recent renovations. Today it is home to International Education and the Office of Graduate Studies. Morgan Hall was named after a prominent local business person, Gifford Morgan, who was also the head of the board of trustees in the 1920s and 1930s.

Gifford Morgan succeeded Herbert Bramley as president of the board. He endorsed Dr. Ernest C. Hartwell as the president of the Brockport State Normal School and enthusiastically supported the "Recommended Minimum Standards as a basis of Granting Degrees by the Normal Schools." This included eight minimum standards that continue to exist within the SUNY system.

Mortimer Hall

Mortimer Hall was built in 1970 and is part of the high rise dorm complex that serves the upperclassmen. It is 12 floors, made up of two and three bedroom suites with study areas on each floor, and kitchen facilities on the top floor. There is also a student health club located in this dormitory.

Mortimer Hall was named after Mary Mortimer, an English immigrant and orphan who was the head of the "female department" of Brockport in the 1840s. She was born in England in 1816 and was brought to this country while still a young child. At age 13, she was orphaned by the sudden death of her parents. Mortimer, along with her good friend Clarissa Thurston, served as the first preceptresses of the Female Department. Mortimer's deeply religious nature colored all of her teaching and her conviction that women were as educable as men was evidenced during her Brockport years. She later founded the Milwaukee Female Seminary.

Neff Hall

Neff Hall was built in 1951 and named after Grace Neff, a first grade teacher critic at the campus demonstration school from 1912 to 1943. Grace Neff was a graduate of the former State Normal School at Geneseo and also studied at Columbia University.

Perry Hall

Perry Hall was built in 1968 and is part of the highrise dormitory complex that also includes Mortimer, Briggs, and Bramley Halls. Upperclassmen dwell in this suite-styled living environment, which has 207 spaces.

Perry Hall was named after Charles Perry, the head of the education and rural school department from 1910 to 1937. Charles F. Perry was born in 1878 and graduated from the former State Normal School at Brockport and later graduated cum laude from Amherst College in Massachusetts.

Rakov Center for Student Services

The Rakov Center was built in 1961 and named after Harold Rakov, a professor of Political Science and an administrator from 1949 to 1984. This building originally served as the campus library, but in 1973 began functioning as the hub for student services including Registration and Records, Career Services, Academic Advisement, Admissions, Financial Aid, and the Bursar's Office.

Harold L. Rakov was born in Syracuse, New York. Dr. Rakov attended Oswego Normal School and received his baccalaureate and doctoral degrees from Syracuse University. Prior to beginning his career at Brockport, he taught at both the junior high and collegiate levels in New York State. During his 33 years at the college, Dr. Rakov's many administrative positions included Director of Admissions, Dean of Students, Director of Graduate Studies, Acting Dean of the college, Associate Dean for Academic Affairs and Vice President for Student Affairs. However, Dr. Rakov is best remembered for his love of teaching. As a professor, chairman and professor emeritus of political science, Dr. Rakov made a lasting difference in the lives of thousands of students, providing motivation, inspiration and challenges. In the words of Dr. Rakov, "If I could write my own epitaph, it would simply be...He was useful. He was useful to people, to the college and to the educational system."

SERC

The Special Events Recreation Center, or The SERC, is the newest state-of-the-art facility on campus. This 138,000 square foot, three-story building serves as the home for Campus Recreation and The College at Brockport’s Golden Eagles Track and Field programs. A major component of the facility is the Field House - designed to accommodate large-scale competitions, including national NCAA track and field events and a variety of recreational activities.

Seymour College Union

The Seymour Union was built in 1969 at a cost of $4,000,000 and is the location of the college union. Seymour Union holds the Barnes & Noble bookstore, a commuter's cafeteria, study areas, the BSG (Brockport Student Government) Offices, the WBSU campus radio station, the ballroom, campus event box office, automated teller machine, Women's Center and other clubs, and the Stylus newspaper.

The Seymour College Union was named after the Seymour brothers, James and William. James was co-founder of Brockport and William was a well-known inventor of agricultural machinery and a member of the board of trustees. As a young man, James moved from Connecticut to Pompey, New York where he served an apprenticeship under his first cousin, Henry Seymour. James moved to Rochester when the newly organized county of Monroe appointed him Sheriff in 1820. He later moved to Michigan.

His brother William, who had been employed by James in Clarkson and Brockport, continued the family mercantile business until 1844. Thereafter, he became involved in an iron foundry and agricultural machine manufacturing until his retirement in 1877.

Smith Hall

Smith Hall was built in 1967 and is a science building, housing Physics and Chemistry.

Smith Hall was named after David Eugene Smith, who headed the school from 1898 to 1901. He succeeded McLean as president, having been selected from a long list of possible candidates. He was born and raised in Cortland, New York and received his Doctorate of Philosophy degree at Syracuse University in 1887. He wanted to establish a close working relationship between the alumni, faculty and students. Dr. Smith studied law in his father's office and was admitted to the bar in 1884. He chose to be a professor of mathematics at Ypsilanti instead. Dr. Smith produced 500 publications, including over 50 textbooks. He arrived in Brockport in 1898 and stayed until 1901. Smith pushed for the expansion of the practice school and fought many a battle with the state over what he saw as inadequate funding. Frustrated by the lack of state support, he left to take a position at Columbia.

Student Townhomes Buildings

A co-ed living option for juniors and seniors, the Student Townhomes offer apartment-style living. Opened in 2007, each of the 52 townhomes in eight buildings and a community center is home to four students and features a full kitchen, dining room, living room, four bedrooms, two full baths and a washer and dryer. They also are fully furnished and equipped with Internet access, air conditioning, cable television and access to convenient parking.

Thompson Hall

Thompson Hall was built in 1958 and is home to freshmen, graduate, adult, and international students. The building also contains a conference center for the occasional meeting.

It was named after Alfred Thompson, principal of the school from 1910 to 1936. Thompson was born in Norwich, Connecticut in 1867 and was educated at Yale University. He was superintendent of schools in Auburn, NY before coming to the Brockport Normal School in 1910. Thompson was a well-respected and highly honored member of the faculty and more than 2,000 graduates received their diplomas from his hands.

Tower Fine Arts Center

The Tower Fine Arts Center was built in 1968 and is the location for the Art, Art History, and Theater departments. The Tower has many art studios, galleries, classrooms, photography laboratories, and a theater for student productions. There is a unique permanent exhibit currently under construction that is to house the largest collection of E. E. Cummings paintings and artwork.

This building was named after Donald Tower, President of the college from 1944 to 1964. Dr. Tower was interested in drama, and wrote a series of drama workbooks.

Tuttle Complex

Tuttle was built in two stages, in 1962 (South) and 1973 (North) and named after Ernest Tuttle, the first director of the Physical Education and Health program, started here in 1945. The Tuttle Complex holds an ice hockey rink, several gymnasiums, classrooms, offices, pools, exercise facilities, and racquetball courts.

Ernest Tuttle was a graduate of Springfield College and had an M.A. from the University of Rochester. He originally taught at Brockport Central High School for four years, before coming to the Normal school in 1937. He taught Physical Education classes and eventually became the Director of the Department in 1945. Tuttle retained that position until his resignation for health reasons in 1964.

Notable faculty
 Garth Fagan (emeritus), Founder of Garth Fagan Dance
 Anne Panning, writer, winner of the 2006 Flannery O'Connor Award and 2009 NY Professor of the Year
 Albert Paley, Professor Emeritus, American sculptor
 Mary Mortimer, "preceptress," i.e. head, of the "female department," 1841–1844. A pioneer of higher education for women, assisted Catherine Beecher in starting the Milwaukee Female Seminary.

Notable alumni
 George Boley, Liberian ex-warlord, former leader of the Liberian Peace Council
Wayne Cilento (B.S. in Dance, 1972): Tony Award-winning choreographer and director 
Scott Donaldson (2004): football coach 
John Faso, (B.A. Political Science and History, 1974) Republican member of the U.S. House of Representatives, from New York's 19th district
William Fichtner (B.A. Criminal Justice, 1978), actor, known for his roles in Prison Break and The Dark Knight
 Joseph Griffo, (B.A. Political Science, 1978) New York State Senator, former mayor of Rome, NY, and former county executive of Oneida County, New York
Delphine Hanna (teaching credential, 1874), physical education professor, Oberlin College
Nancy Hewitt (B.A. in History, 1974): Professor emeritus at Rutgers University and expert on gender history and feminism
 Joey Jackson (B.A. in Political Science, 1988): Attorney and legal analyst on CNN and HLN
 James Howard Kunstler (B.S. in Leisure/Recreational Activity, 1971): author, social critic, public speaker, blogger
 Christine Lavin (B.S. in English, 1973): Singer-songwriter and promoter of contemporary folk music
 Ryan Nobles (B.S. in Communication, 1998): journalist with CNN 
 Oliver North, later attended the United States Naval Academy, known for Iran-Contra Affair
 Paul Pape (B.A. in Theatre, Speech & Hearing, 1974): actor and voice actor known for role as Double J in 1977 film Saturday Night Fever
 Yendi Phillips (BFA in Dance, 2006): Jamaican TV host, model, and beauty queen 
 Gene Spafford (B.A. Mathematics and Computer Science, 1979), professor at Purdue University and leading computer security expert
 Elizabeth Streb (B.S. in Dance, 1972): choreographer, performer and teacher of contemporary dance 
 Joe Torres (B.S. Communications), news anchor WABC-TV in NYC
 Dave Trembley (B.A. Physical Education, 1973, M.A.), former manager of the Baltimore Orioles
 Stan Van Gundy (B.S. in Physical Education, 1981): Head coach of the New Orleans Pelicans of the NBA
Al Walker (born 1959), former basketball player and college coach, now a scout for the Detroit Pistons of the NBA

References

Further reading

External links

 Official website

 
Brockport, New York
1867 establishments in New York (state)
Brockport
Universities and colleges in Monroe County, New York
Dance in New York (state)
Public universities and colleges in New York (state)